

Epiphanes, meaning "God Manifest" or "the Glorious/Illustrious", is an ancient Greek epithet borne by several Hellenistic rulers:

Antiochus IV Epiphanes (c. 215–164 BC), ruler of the Seleucid Empire
Antiochus XI Epiphanes (reigned 95–92 BC), ruler of the Seleucid Empire
Ariarathes VI Epiphanes Philopator (reigned 130–116 BC), King of Cappadocia 
Ariarathes VIII Epiphanes (reigned 101–96 BC), King of Cappadocia
Gaius Julius Antiochus IV Epiphanes, the last king of Commagene who reigned between 38–72
Gaius Julius Archelaus Antiochus Epiphanes (38-92), prince of the Kingdom of Commagene
Seleucus VI Epiphanes (reigned 96–95 BC), ruler of the Seleucid Empire
Polyxenos Epiphanes Soter (ca. 100 BC), Indo-Greek ruler
Ptolemy V Epiphanes (reigned 204–181 BC), ruler of the Ptolemaic dynasty
Mithridates II of Parthia, king of the Parthian Empire
Nicomedes II Epiphanes

Other people
Joseph-Epiphane Darras (1825–1878), Church historian
Epiphanes (gnostic), legendary Gnostic writer

Animals
Epiphanes (rotifer), a genus of rotifer in the order Ploima.
Hypermastus epiphanes, a sea snail in the family Eulimidae
Inape epiphanes, a moth of the family Tortricidae
Izatha epiphanes, a moth of the family Oecophoridae

Places
Saint-Épiphane, a municipality in Quebec, Canada

See also
Euergetes
 Inscription of Parthian imperial power
Soter
Epiphanius (disambiguation)
Epiphany (disambiguation)
Eusebes (disambiguation)

Ancient Greek titles
Epithets